White Teeth is a 2000 novel by the British author Zadie Smith. It focuses on the later lives of two wartime friends—the Bangladeshi Samad Iqbal and the Englishman Archie Jones—and their families in London. The novel centres on Britain's relationship with immigrants from the British Commonwealth.

White Teeth won multiple honors, including the 2000 James Tait Black Memorial Prize for fiction, the 2000 Whitbread Book Award in category best first novel, the Guardian First Book Award, the Commonwealth Writers First Book Prize, and the Betty Trask Award. Time magazine included the novel in its list of the 100 Best English-language Novels from 1923 to 2005. In 2022, it was included on the "Big Jubilee Read" list of 70 books by Commonwealth authors, selected to celebrate the Platinum Jubilee of Elizabeth II.

Summary
On New Year's Day 1975, Archie Jones, a 47-year-old Englishman whose disturbed Italian wife has just walked out on him, is attempting to take his own life by gassing himself in his car when a chance interruption causes him to change his mind. Filled with a fresh enthusiasm for life, Archie flips a coin and then finds his way into the aftermath of a New Year's Eve party. There he meets the much-younger Clara Bowden, a Jamaican woman whose mother, Hortense, is a devout Jehovah's Witness. Clara had been interested in the unattractive, anti-social Ryan Topps, but their relationship falls apart after Ryan becomes a member of the Jehovah's Witnesses and becomes close to her mother. Archie and Clara are soon married and have a daughter, Irie, who grows up to be intelligent but with low self-confidence.

Also living in Willesden, London, is Archie's best friend Samad Iqbal, a Bengali Muslim from Bangladesh; the two men spend much of their time at the O'Connell's pub. Archie and Samad met in 1945 when they were part of a tank crew inching through Europe in the final days of World War II, though they missed out on the action. Following the war, Samad emigrated to Britain and married Alsana Iqbal, née Alsana Begum, or "Miss Alsana", in a traditional arranged marriage. Samad is a downtrodden waiter in a West End curry house, and is obsessed by the history of his supposed but unlikely great-grandfather, Mangal Pandey, a Hindu soldier from Uttar Pradesh, not Bengal, who is famous for firing the first shot of the Indian Rebellion of 1857 (though he missed and was executed). Samad and Alsana have twin boys, Magid and Millat, who are the same age as Irie. Samad in particular finds it difficult to maintain his devotion to Islam in an English life; he is continually tormented by what he sees as the effects of this cultural conflict upon his own moral character—his Muslim values are corrupted by his masturbation, beer drinking, and his affair with his children's music teacher, Poppy Burt-Jones. In an attempt to preserve his traditional beliefs, he sends 10-year-old Magid to Bangladesh in the hope that he will grow up properly under the teachings of Islam. From then on, the lives of the two boys follow very different paths. To Samad's fury, Magid becomes an Anglicised atheist and devotes his life to science. Millat, meanwhile, pursues a rebellious path of womanising, drinking and petty hooliganism—as well as harbouring a love of mob movies such as The Godfather and Goodfellas. Angry at his people's marginalisation in English society, Millat demonstrates against Salman Rushdie for his novel The Satanic Verses in 1989 and eventually pledges himself to a militant Muslim fundamentalist brotherhood known as "Keepers of the Eternal and Victorious Islamic Nation" (KEVIN).

The lives of the Joneses and Iqbals intertwine with that of the white, middle-class Chalfens, a lapsed Jewish-Catholic family of Oxbridge-educated intellectuals who typify a distinctive strain of North London liberal trendiness, and who are recruited by Irie and Millat's school to tutor them. The father, Marcus Chalfen, is a university lecturer and geneticist working on a controversial 'FutureMouse' project in which he introduces chemical carcinogens into the body of a mouse and is thus able to observe the progression of a tumour in living tissue. By re-engineering the actual genome and watching cancers progress at pre-determined times, Marcus believes he is eliminating the random. The mother, Joyce Chalfen, is a horticulturist and part-time housewife with an often entirely misguided desire to mother and 'heal' Millat as if he were one of her plants. To some extent, the Chalfen family provides a safe haven as they (believe themselves to) accept and understand the turbulent lives of Irie, Magid, and Millat. Irie finds herself working for Marcus as a secretary, Marcus takes an intellectual interest in Magid and subsidizes his flight home, and even Millat's grades slightly improve.

However, both Alsana and Clara become suspicious of their children constantly spending time at the Chalfens, and Joyce and Marcus's arrogance antagonize both Clara and the Iqbal family. The Chalfens' actions also comes at the expense of their own son, Joshua, whose difficulties are ignored by his parents. Originally a well-moulded "Chalfenist", Joshua rebels against his father and his background by joining the radical animal rights group "Fighting Animal Torture and Exploitation" (FATE). Meanwhile, after his return from Bangladesh, Magid works as Marcus's research assistant on the FutureMouse project, while Millat becomes further involved in KEVIN. Irie, who has been working for Marcus, briefly succeeds in her long-hidden attraction to Millat but is rejected under his KEVIN-inspired beliefs. Irie believes that Millat cannot love her, for he has always been "the second son" both symbolically and literally, for Millat was born two minutes after Magid. Irie makes Magid the "second son" for a change by sleeping with him immediately after having sex with Millat. This causes her to become pregnant, and she is left unsure of the father of her child, as the brothers are identical twins.

The strands of the narrative grow closer as Millat and KEVIN, Joshua and FATE, and Clara's mother Hortense and the Jehovah's Witnesses all plan to demonstrate their opposition to Marcus's FutureMouse—which they view as an evil interference with their own religious and ethical beliefs—at its exhibition on New Year's Eve 1992. At the Perret Institute, Hortense and the other Jehovah's Witnesses sing loudly in the hallway. Samad goes out to hush them, but when he arrives he cannot summon the heart to make them stop. When he returns, he realizes that the founder of the Perret Institute and the oldest scientist on Marcus Chalfen's panel is Dr. Perret, the Nazi he captured during World War II. Enraged that Archie did not kill him all those years ago, Samad runs over and begins cursing Archie. Just then, Millat advances on the table of scientists with a gun. Without thinking, Archie jumps in front of him and takes a bullet in the thigh. As he falls, he knocks over the mouse's glass cage, and it escapes.

At the novel's end, the narrator presents us with different "end games" in the style of television. Magid and Millat both serve community service for Millat's crime, since witnesses identify both as the culprit. Joshua and Irie end up together and join Hortense in Jamaica in the year 2000 with Irie's daughter. Mickey opens up the previously men-only O'Connell's pub to women, and Archie and Samad finally invite their wives along with them.

Major characters

Alfred Archibald Jones
Archie is mediocre and indecisive, preferring to make his most important decisions with the flip of a coin. Archie's ex-wife is Ophelia Diagilo, whom he supposedly drove insane with his mediocrity. He later marries Clara, a Jamaican woman less than half his age, with whom he has a daughter, Irie. Archie's best friend is Samad Iqbal. The two men served together in World War II in the British Army and frequently visit O'Connell's pub.

Samad Miah Iqbal
Archie's best friend, a middle-aged World War II veteran with a crippled right hand. Samad was born in Bangladesh and met Archie when they were soldiers in Eastern Europe. He works as a waiter at an Indian restaurant, where he receives few tips. His wife is Alsana Begum, and his twin sons are Magid and Millat. More than anything, Samad wants his sons to grow into religious, traditional Bengali Muslim men. To ensure this, he goes to great lengths, even sending Magid to be raised in Bangladesh (for all intents and purposes, this was a kidnapping).

Clara Bowden
Clara Jones, née Bowden, was an awkward, unpopular Jehovah's Witness who spent her adolescence canvassing door-to-door. When she meets the equally unappealing Ryan Topps, she abandons her religion and takes up his rebellious ways, though Ryan becomes a staunch Jehovah's Witness himself. When Ryan and Clara crash into a tree on Ryan's scooter, Clara's top teeth are knocked out. She meets Archie Jones and marries him, even though she finds him unimpressive and he is more than twice her age. Archie and Clara have a daughter named Irie.

Alsana Begum
Alsana Iqbal, née Begum, is the young wife of Samad Iqbal, to whom she was promised before her birth. They have twin sons, Magid and Millat. To help pay bills, she sews clothing on her home sewing machine for an S&M shop called Domination in Soho. Although charismatic and judgemental by nature, she thinks marriage is best handled with silence. However, she has a volcanic temper and generally wins fights with Samad by injuring him.

Irie Ambrosia Jones
Irie—whose name means "OK, cool, peaceful" in Patois—is the daughter of Clara and Archie Jones. Irie has been friends with Magid and Millat Iqbal since birth. After struggling with her sexuality and racial identity, Irie finds answers in her grandmother, Hortense Bowden. She resolves to go into the field of dentistry and, despite her best efforts to prevent it, ends up with Joshua Chalfen. Having slept with both Magid and Millat, Irie gives birth to a daughter whose father can never be known, as the twins have exactly the same DNA.

Irie is mentioned in passing in two other novels by Zadie Smith, Swing Time and NW.

Millat Zulfikar Iqbal
Millat, born two minutes later than his twin brother Magid, is the younger son of Samad and Alsana. After Magid is sent to Bangladesh, Millat comes into his own as a trouble-making, pot-smoking, womanising rebel. However, Millat eventually rejects this lifestyle in favour of fundamentalist Islam, becoming a major driving force of KEVIN. At the FutureMouse conference, he tries to shoot Dr Perret, but instead shoots Archie in the thigh. Millat may or may not be the father of Irie's baby.

Magid Mahfooz Murshed Mubtasim Iqbal
Magid is the elder son of Samad and Alsana, and twin brother of Millat. Magid is intellectually precocious and insists on dressing and acting like an adult, even at a very young age. Samad essentially kidnaps Magid and sends him to be raised traditionally in Bangladesh. When he finally returns to London, he joins Marcus Chalfen's FutureMouse programme. Magid is fascinated by the certainty of fate genetic engineering offers, and by having the power to choose another creature's path, as his was chosen for him. Magid may or may not be the father of Irie's baby.

Marcus Chalfen
Marcus Chalfen is a Jewish genetic engineer and husband of Joyce Chalfen. His controversial FutureMouse experiment involves genetically altering a mouse so that it develops cancers at specific times and sites. Marcus loses interest in mentoring Irie when he begins corresponding with Magid, and condescendingly advises that Irie is only intelligent enough to be a dentist.

Joyce Chalfen
Joyce is a horticulturalist, writer, and the wife of Marcus Chalfen. She has four sons, all of whom adore her fiercely. Joyce is a natural nurturer and constantly feels the need to care for things and people. From the moment they meet, Millat entrances Joyce, and she feels the need to mother him and pander to his needs, which Millat exploits.

Joshua Chalfen
Joshua is the son of Joyce and Marcus Chalfen. Originally interested in his studies at Glenard Oak School, Joshua rebels against the Chalfens (particularly his father) by joining the animal-rights groups FATE. Joshua has a long-standing crush on Irie and, later, on Joely, who along with husband Crispin head the group. He stays in FATE largely as an excuse to remain close to her.

Reception

In 2019, the novel was ranked 39th on The Guardian'''s list of the 100 best books of the 21st century.

On 5 November 2019 BBC News included White Teeth on its list of the 100 most influential novels.

Though, generally, the book was critically acclaimed, the critic James Wood was largely hostile, while reserving a few moments for praise. The novel has since been the subject of numerous scholarly articles.

Adaptations
A four-part television adaptation of the novel was made and broadcast on Channel 4 in 2002, White Teeth. It was directed by Julian Jarrold, starring Om Puri as Samad and Phil Davis as Archie. Each episode focuses on a major male character as he encounters a turning point in his life: "The Peculiar Second Marriage of Archie Jones", "The Temptation of Samad Iqbal", "The Trouble With Millat", and "The Return of Magid Iqbal".

In 2018 London's Kiln Theatre announced the world premiere of Stephen Sharkey's stage adaptation of the novel. Directed by the venue's Artistic Director Indhu Rubasingham, the production features 13 original songs by Paul Englishby and stars Tony Jayawardena as Samad, Richard Lumsden as Archie and Ayesha Antoine as Irie.

See also

 Hysterical realism
 Mangal Pandey
 Historiographical metafiction

References

Further reading
 Squires, Claire. White Teeth – A Reader's Guide (New York: Continuum International, 2002).
 Bentley, Nick. "Zadie Smith, White Teeth", 2008. In Contemporary British Fiction, pp. 52–61. Edinburgh: Edinburgh University Press. .

External links
 
 Zadie Smith discusses White Teeth on the BBC World Book Club Official website for film adaptation (with trailer)
 Description of White Teeth at Random House.
 Excerpted portion from White Teeth

 White Teeth by Zadie Smith. Exploration of the cultural implications of Zadie Smith's debut novel by Stephen Moss.
 John Mullan, "After post-colonialism" (review of White Teeth), The Guardian, 12 October 2002.
 Sean O'Hagan, "Zadie bites back", The Observer, 25 August 2002. Article on the TV adaptation of White Teeth''.

2000 British novels
2000 debut novels
British novels adapted into plays
British novels adapted into television shows
Costa Book Award-winning works
Family saga novels
Hamish Hamilton books
Interracial romance novels
Novels by Zadie Smith
Novels set in Jamaica
Novels set in London
Postcolonial novels
Postmodern novels
Willesden